Helikon Opera is a Russian opera company based in Moscow, specializing in unconventional productions. Their main performing base is the 250 seat Mayakovsky Theater, the former ballroom in the palace of the Shakhovskoi-Glebov-Streshneva family who were patrons of the arts in 19th century Moscow. The company was founded by Dmitry Bertman and gave its first performance, Stravinsky's  Mavra, on April 10, 1990.

History
Helikon Opera gives 200 performances a year, primarily in Moscow but also abroad, performing in the UK for the first time in 1997. The company's repertoire includes both mainstream works and rarely performed operas and chamber operas. In the past they have staged Fleishman's Rothschild's Violin, Hindemith's Hin und zurück and Prokofiev's Maddalena and were the first company to revive Tchaikovsky's Undine (1994) and to stage  Prokofiev's The Ugly Duckling (1992). In October 2010, Helikon gave the first performance of Tchaikovsky's Mazeppa to be seen in Moscow in six years.

References

External links
Helikon Opera official website (English version)

Russian opera companies
Musical groups established in 1990
Opera houses in Russia
1990 establishments in Russia